Vinnakota Sameer (also called Sameer Hasan) is an Indian actor from Andhra Pradesh who predominantly appears in Telugu films and TV programs.

Life
He is married to Aparna. They are currently living in Hyderabad. Sameer and Aparna won the finals of Moguds Pellams, a TV program conducted by MAA TV for celebrity couples.

Career 
He has been acting in TV serials since Doordarshan days. He has a supporting role in Ruthu Ragalu. Sameer made his film debut in Subha Sankalpam (1995), directed by K. Viswanath.

Television career
 Ruthuragalu (Maa TV)
 Moguds Pellams (Maa TV)
 Bigg Boss 1 (Star Maa; 2017)
Santhi Nivasam(ETV)
Ala Venkatapuramlo (Gemini TV)

Filmography

Telugu

 Prema Pusthakam (1993)
 Subha Sankalpam (1995)
 Aahaa..! (1998)
 Student No.1 (2001)
 Indra (2002)
 Simhadri (2003)
 Tagore (2003)
 Sye (2004)
 Mass (2004)
 Samba (2004)
 Athade Oka Sainyam (2004)
 Jai Chiranjeeva (2005)
 That Is Pandu (2005)
 Lakshmi (2006)
 Sri Ramadasu (2006)
 Style (2006 film)
 Rakhi (2006)
 Anasuya (2007)
 Pandurangadu (2008)
 Hero (2008)
  Cell (2008)
 Magadheera (2009)
 Orange (2010)
 Nagavalli (2010)
 Pilla Zamindar (2011)
 Mr Perfect (2011)
 Sri Rama Rajyam (2011)
 Damarukam (2012)
 Attarintiki Daredi (2013)
 Legend (2014)
 Laddu Babu (2014)
 Lion (2015)
 Kerintha (2015)
 Kick 2 (2015)
 Bruce Lee: The Fighter (2015)
 Bengal Tiger (2015)
 Sarrainodu (2016)
  Control C (2016)
 Keshava (2017)
 Duvvada Jagannadham (2017)
 Agnyaathavaasi (2018)
 Pantham (2018)
 Saakshyam (2018)
 Devadas (2018)
  Desamlo Dongalu Paddaru (2018)
 Maharshi (2019)
 Kathanam (2019)
Anukunnadi Okkati Ayyandhi Okati (2020)
Idhe Maa Katha (2021)
Alludu Adhurs (2021)
Dhamaka (2022)

References 

Living people
Indian male film actors
Male actors in Telugu cinema
1973 births
Bigg Boss (Telugu TV series) contestants
People from Visakhapatnam district
People from Visakhapatnam
Male actors from Visakhapatnam
Male actors from Andhra Pradesh
1975 births
Indian male actors